Lalenok United Football Club, commonly known as Lalenok United, is an East Timorese football club based in Dili. The team plays in the Liga Futebol Amadora Primeira Divisão, after finishing runners up and being promoted from the Segunda Divisão in 2018. In 2019 the team won the Primeira Divisão title, finishing the season with a total of 30 points from 14 matches, 5 points clear of previous champion Boavista.

In the same season the team also won the Taça 12 de Novembro and the LFA Super Taça, becoming the first Timorese team to ever win all three competitions. In 2020 Lalenok became the first ever East Timorese football club to ever compete in the AFC Cup, playing against Indonesian Liga 1 side PSM Makassar in their opening match in the ASEAN Play-off round.

AFC Cup 2020 

After the team's victory in the 2019 LFA Primeira Divisão season Lalenok United became the first ever East Timorese football club to ever qualify to compete at the level of continental competition, with all previous winners of the Timorese league failing to pass the continental competitions registration process. Drawn up against professional Indonesian Liga 1 side PSM Makassar for their first match, in the build up to the fixture Lalenok United president Pedro Belo admitted that the team likely did not have a big chance for their debut in the competition. Belo recognised the strength of the opposition side, however had confidence that the squad would work hard in its attempts to represent football within Timor Leste and was proud of the international recognition the club had achieved from qualifying.

The first leg of the match was a home game for Lalenok, however it was played at Kapten I Wayan Dipta Stadium in Indonesia rather than at the club's own stadium. Lalenok United got off to an early lead with a goal being scored by striker Daniel Adade in the second minute of the match to put the team up 1–0. PSM Makassar however were quick to equalise, and after a red card from Lalenok's goal keeper Agbozo Nathaniel was given for a foul outside the box the Indonesian side proceeded to score 3 more goals ending the game as a 1–4 loss for Lalenok United.

In the second leg the team suffered a similar result. The team conceded 2 goals in the first half hour of the match and despite PSM Makassar receiving 2 red cards later on they were not able to comeback losing the match 3-1. The team's only goal was scored by defender Francisco da Costa. This resulted in an aggregate score of 2-7, causing Lalenok to be eliminated from the competition.

Squad
As of 29 January 2021

Competition records

League

Liga Futebol Amadora

Segunda Divisão 

 2017: Segunda Divisaun Promotion Playoff Winners
 2018: Runners up (Promoted)

 Primeira Divisão

 2019: Champions

Cup

Taça 12 de Novembro 
 2018: Quarter Finals
 2019: Champions

LFA Super Taça

 2019: Champions

Copa FFTL 

 2020: Champions

Sponsors
Bintang Beer

Links 

 Official Facebook page
Official Website

Continental record

References

Football clubs in East Timor
Football
Association football clubs established in 2016